Belenoluk is a village in the Pervari District of Siirt Province in Turkey. The village is populated by Kurds of the Adiyan and Şakiran tribs and had a population of 765 in 2021.

References 

Villages in Pervari District
Kurdish settlements in Siirt Province